Leonard Drake (born July 16, 1954 – September 29, 2010)  He was a native of Chicago, Illinois. His collegiate coaching career spanned 33 years serving as head coach and assistant coach in both men's and women's basketball. He ended his career as athletics director at Evansville Central High School in Evansville, IN. Drake was a four-year letterman for the Central Michigan basketball team. He received several honors for his play with the Chippewas.

Coaching
Over Leonard Drake's 33-year career, he was part of eight conference championships, seven conference tournament championships, five NCAA tournaments, four NITs, and one WNIT. He coached NAIA team, Xavier of Louisiana, as well as three teams from the Mid-American Conference (MAC) and one from the Southland Conference.

Head coaching record

References 

1954 births
2010 deaths
American men's basketball coaches
American women's basketball coaches
Ball State Cardinals men's basketball coaches
Basketball coaches from Illinois
Central Michigan Chippewas men's basketball coaches
Central Michigan Chippewas men's basketball players
Eastern Michigan Eagles women's basketball coaches
Lamar Cardinals basketball coaches
Lamar Lady Cardinals basketball coaches
Sportspeople from Chicago
Xavier Gold Rush basketball coaches
Basketball players from Chicago